Peter Doyle was a former Australian professional soccer player who played as a half-back for Newcastle clubs and the Australia national soccer team.

Club career
Doyle played with Adamstown, winning the 1920 Northern NSW Premiership, and won a Gardiner Cup in 1925 as captain. He became the first Adamstown player to represent Australia and first to captain the NSW representative team. He played against Canada and the England XI team as captain.

International career
Doyle appeared in all three Australia international matches in 1922, including one extra match against New Zealand in 1923.

Career statistics

International

References

Year of birth missing
Year of death missing
Australian soccer players
Association football midfielders
Australia international soccer players